Batini may refer to:

 Bateinoi or Batini, an old Germanic tribe recorded by Ptolemy
 Batin (Islam)
 Batini (drink), an alcoholic drink
 Batiniyya, those who believe the hidden meaning of the Quran